Pruszków  ( Prushkov) is a city in east-central Poland, situated in the Masovian Voivodeship since 1999. It was previously in Warszawa Voivodeship (1975–1998). Pruszków is the capital of Pruszków County, located along the western edge of the Warsaw urban area.

In the 1990s and 2000s the city was synonymous with the "Pruszków gang", one of two major organised crime groups in the country. Currently it is best known for being the country's cycling centre with a purpose built indoor velodrome.

History 

Pruszków was incorporated as a town in 1916 during World War I, although the village was first mentioned in chronicles in the 15th century. Within the Polish Crown, it was a private village of Polish nobility, administratively located in the Masovian Voivodeship in the Greater Poland Province. The development of the town was aided by the construction of the Warsaw-Vienna Railway in the 19th century and the construction of the Elektryczna Kolej Dojazdowa (now Warszawska Kolej Dojazdowa), Poland's first electrified commuter train line, in 1927. In the late 19th century, industry developed intensively in Pruszków. There were needles, porcelain, faience, and soap factories in Pruszków. A large psychiatric hospital opened in the outlying village of Tworki in 1891 and is still operating to this day. During World War I, a battle between German and Russian forces took place in Pruszków on 12–18 October 1914 (part of Battle of the Vistula River). Despite the initial success of the German forces on 12 October, they were push-backed out of town after successful Russian counter-attack on 14th. An intense artillery fire by both sides caused severe damages to many buildings in Pruszków including train station, power plant, and two churches. In August 1915 Pruszków was taken by the German forces without a fight. Within interwar Poland, it was administratively located in the Warsaw County in the Warsaw Voivodeship.

World War II

The city was occupied by Germany following the German–Soviet invasion of Poland, which started World War II in September 1939. On 14 December 1939, the Germans murdered 46 Poles from Pruszków during the large Palmiry massacre. Before the invasion, the city had a large Jewish population. In 1940, the German occupation authorities established a Jewish ghetto in Pruszków, in order to confine its Jewish population for the purpose of persecution and exploitation. From there, most victims were sent to Treblinka extermination camp.

During the 1944 Warsaw Uprising, the Nazis created the large Durchgangslager 121 (Dulag 121) transit camp in Pruszków on the site of the Train Repair Shops (Zakłady Naprawcze Taboru Kolejowego) to intern the evacuees expelled from the capital. Around 550,000 Warsaw residents and approximately 100,000 more from its outskirts were incarcerated in the camp. The SS and Gestapo segregated the Poles, who were then either deported to forced labour in Germany, sent to Nazi concentration camps, or expelled to more southern locations of German-occupied Poland. Approximately 650,000 Poles passed through the Pruszków camp in August, September and October 1944. Approximately 55,000 were sent to concentration camps, including 13,500 to Auschwitz, 12,000 to Ravensbrück and 8,700 to Mauthausen. They included people from a variety of social classes and occupations (government officials, scholars, artists, physicians, merchants, and blue-collar workers), in varying physical conditions (the injured, the sick, invalids, and pregnant women), and of various ages from infants only a few weeks old to the elderly, aged 86 or more. In a few cases, these were also people of different ethnic backgrounds including Jews living on "Aryan papers." The Germans murdered several Polish Catholic monks and nuns in the camp.

Following the Soviet westward offensive, on 26 March 1945, the 16 members of the Polish Underground Government were invited by the Russians for talks, to a house in Pruszków on Armii Krajowej Street. They were captured by the Soviet NKVD agents, transported to USSR, imprisoned, tortured and sentenced in Moscow during the so-called Trial of the Sixteen.

Post-war Poland
After World War II, Pruszków became one of Masovia's largest industrial centers. Due to its proximity to Warsaw, it is now home to several factories and companies, including Herbapol, Daewoo Electronics, L'Oréal Cosmetics as well as logistic centers. It is also an important sports center, with a sports gymnasium, soccer stadium and a cycling course.

Crime
The most well known of the Polish organised crime groups in the 1990s was the so-called "Pruszków gang" and their arch-nemesis' the "Wołomin gang", with whom they fought bloody turf wars. Eventually the groups were finally crushed by the Polish police in cooperation with the German police in a spectacular raid on the A2 motorway between Konin and Poznań in September 2011.

Population
The town's population has grown significantly, from 16,000 in the early part of the 20th century to 60,068 in the 2014 census by the Central Statistical Office of Poland.

Sports 

The city's local football team is Znicz Pruszków. It plays in the third division but in the past it competed in the second division between 2007-2010 and 2016-2017. Robert Lewandowski played for Znicz from 2006 to 2008, whereas Pruszków-born Jacek Gmoch and Radosław Majewski also played in Znicz: Gmoch from 1953 to 1958, Majewski from 2002 to 2006.

The city has two professional basketball teams: women's  and the basketball section of the football club, men's Znicz Basket Pruszków.

The Pruszków Arena is a modern indoor velodrome.

Buildings and structures 
256 metres tall chimney of former "Pruszków II Power Plant", now used as radio tower.

Education 
 Physical Culture and Tourism High School (Wyższa Szkoła Kultury Fizycznej i Turystyki)

Notable people

Leszek Cichy (born 1951), mountaineer and high-altitude climber
Jacek Gmoch (born 1939), footballer and football manager
Ałbena Grabowska (born 1971), writer, neurologist
Bronisław Komorowski (born 1952), former President of Poland, spent part of his childhood in Pruszków
Jan Lechoń (1899–1956), poet, spent part of his childhood in Pruszków
Radosław Majewski (born 1986), footballer
Konrad Morawski (1913–1985), television and theatre actor

References

External links 
 
  
  Alleycat races in Pruszków
  Museum of Ancient Mazovian Metallurgy
 Jewish Community in Pruszków on Virtual Shtetl]

Cities and towns in Masovian Voivodeship
Pruszków County
Masovian Voivodeship (1526–1795)
Warsaw Governorate
Warsaw Voivodeship (1919–1939)
Holocaust locations in Poland